2A19 or T-12  is a Soviet-designed 100-mm anti-tank gun. It was the first anti-tank gun to adopt a smoothbore barrel, and to introduce modern armor piercing shot, like the  APFSDS. It uses long projectiles that are more powerful than its caliber suggests. The T-12 served as the primary towed anti-tank artillery in the Soviet and Bulgarian armies from the early 1960s to the late 1980s.

History 
The T-12 was designed by the construction bureau of the Yurga Machine-Building Plant as a replacement for the BS-3 100 mm gun. The first serial examples were produced in 1955, but the T-12 entered service only in 1961. Its special feature was the use of a smoothbore gun. The T-12 was typically deployed in the anti-tank units of armored and motor rifle regiments to protect flanks against counter-attacks during rapid advances.

In 1971 a new variant was introduced, T-12A or MT-12 "Rapira" (2A29). This has the same barrel, but has a redesigned carriage and gun shield. This allows the MT-12 to be towed by the MT-LB, giving greater mobility. The 2A29R "Ruta" or MT-12R is an MT-12 version with a radar system. From 1981, the gun could fire the laser beam-riding guided missile 9M117 Kastet (weapon system 9K116) and carried the new designator 2A29K "Kastet" or MT-12K.

By the mid-1990s modern western tanks' frontal armor protection could no longer be penetrated by a 100 mm gun. The 100 mm caliber ammunition had reached the limits of what could be achieved with it. For a static anti-tank that cannot move to attack the sides of an opponent this is extra problematic. Today, the T-12 is applied mostly in the role of ordinary artillery, using FRAG-HE shells. The T-12 was planned to be superseded by the 2A45 Sprut-B 125 mm smooth bore anti-tank gun.

Description

A revolutionary smoothbore gun 
On introduction, the T-12's gun differed from all existing artillery by employing a smoothbore barrel instead of a rifled one. The reasons to introduce a smoothbore barrel primarily relate to armor piercing shot. This kind of shot relies on mechanically penetrating armor. It is most effective if it has the form of a long narrow diameter rod fired at very high speed. In flight it can be stabilized by a rifled gun barrel having given it rotation when it was fired, but this becomes less effective if the projectile becomes longer. The T-12 gun overcame the stabilization problem by applying fins to the projectile. This started the replacement of the armour-piercing discarding sabot (APDS) fired by rifled guns by the armour-piercing fin-stabilized discarding sabot (APFSDS) shot fired by smoothbore guns.

Another reason to use a smoothbore barrel for armor piercing shot, is that smoothbore guns allow for higher pressures, and thus higher projectile speeds. The result is that the T-12 fired a conspicuously long APFSDS projectile. This BM2 shot (see picture) had a diameter of 38 mm and used 8.75kg of propellant instead of less than 6kg for the existing Soviet tank gun. It was fired at a muzzle velocity of 1,540 m/s as opposed to only 900 m/s for the usual armor piercing shot. At 1,000 m this improved armor penetration from 185 mm to 230 mm, enough to penetrate most NATO tanks of the period.

High-explosive anti-tank (HEAT) shells do not rely on high speed to penetrate armor, but on the explosion of the projectile on impact. The problem of using a rifled gun to fire a HEAT shot was that the stabilizing spin degraded the penetrating power by as much as half. Combined with other challenges HEAT shots were not effective for tank guns in the mid-1950s. The T-12 overcame most problems by firing a HEAT shot that was stabilized by pop-out fins. However, it was still not ideal as it was slow and therefore had to be fired in a higher arc. This was complicated by the Soviet scarcity of good rangefinders.

In 1958 Nikita Khrushchev saw the T-12 and was so enthusiastic about the gun, that he wanted it placed in the T55. However, the long ammunition would not fit in the existing Soviet medium-tank turrets. Therefore, the 115 mm U-5TS gun of the T-62 was developed with a larger caliber, so it could use more propellant while not requiring the very long T-12 projectiles.

The T-12's breech is semi-automatic, meaning that it needs to be opened only before the first shot. After the first shot the breech opens by itself, so a new projectile can immediately be loaded.

Other charactertistics 

The T-12 used the carriage of the 85 mm anti-tank gun D-48. In fact the only difference between the T-12 and the D-48 was the barrel. Both can be told apart by the muzzle brake, which becomes wider towards the end of the D-48's barrel, but has the same width throughout for the T-12 and MT-12. The wheels of both D-48 and T-12 are secured by six bolts. The carriage of the T-12 did not allow it to be towed cross-country by fast tracked vehicles. It was therefore usually towed by trucks. This limited the T-12's cross country movement to only 15 km/h. 

The gun can be fitted with the LO-7 ski gear for travel across snow or swampy ground. This is a metal welded structure with wide runners. The wheels are rolled up to the runners and fastened with a coupling chain. The gun can fire directly from the skis.

The principal difference between the upper part of the T-12 and that of the MT-12 is in the equilibrator that is used. That of the T-12 is hardly visible, whereas that of the MT-12 is a huge tube lying on top of the right rear part of the gun. Standing behind the gun, a barrel that has two short tubes on top of the gun barrel between the breech and the gun shield, is a T-12. If a third misaligned tube is present on the right side, the gun is an MT-12.

The gun requires a crew of six: commander, driver of the towing vehicle, gun layer, loader, and two ammunition crewmen. Since the weapon is a smoothbore, all the ammunition is finned for accuracy during flight.

The standard equipment of the T-12 includes multiple sights. The indirect aiming mechanism consists of the S71-40 mechanism with panoramic PG-1M sight. The OP4M-40U sight is used for direct fire. The APN-5-40 or APN-6-40 are used for direct fire by night.

Ammunition 
Note: penetration numbers for RHA at 90 degrees.

APFSDS 

3BM-2
APFSDS-T Tungsten
 Round weight: 
 Projectile weight: 
 Muzzle velocity: 
 Maximum range: 
 Penetration:
230 mm at 500 m (9 in at 550 yd)
180 mm at 2,000 m (7 in at 2,200 yd)
140 mm at 3,000 m (5.5 in at 3,300 yd)

3BM23/3UBM10
APFSDS
 Round weight: 
 Projectile weight: 
 Muzzle velocity: 
 Maximum range: 
 Penetration: 225 mm at 1000 m (8.8 in at 1100 yd)

HEAT 
3BK16M/3UBK8
 Round weight: 
 Projectile weight: 
 Muzzle velocity: 
 Maximum range: 
 Penetration:

HE-FRAG 
3OF12/3OF35
 Round weight: 
 Projectile weight: 
 Muzzle velocity: 
 Maximum range (indirect):

Guided projectile 
9K117 Kastet 3UBK10/3UBK10M

Beam riding laser guided projectile.
 Round weight: 
 Projectile weight: 
 Average speed: 
 Range: 
 Penetration:

Operators

: 10
: 126
: 80
: 16
: 68
: 18
: 37

: 20+
 Transnistria
: 60
: 500
: 36

Former operators

: 267
: 100
: 50

: 100
  People's Republic of Kampuchea: 15
: 25
: 25
: 72

: 350

Combat history

Russo-Ukrainian War 
During the War in Donbas (2014–2022), the Ukrainian army had 500 anti tank guns of the types T-12, MT-12 and MT-12R. Reports about the gun often do not properly discern T-12 from MT-12. During the during the War in Donbas, the use of the MT-12 was documented on many pictures. The use of the T-12 is less certain.

During the 2022 Russian invasion of Ukraine, Ukrainian forces were again observed using the MT-12. The old T-12 was not sighted that often. However, in January 2023, the BBC published an article and video showing the use of a T-12 by Ukrainian forces near Bakhmut.

The two Ukrainian self propelled 100 mm T-12's, dubbed MT-LB-12 are undoubtedly T-12's, not MT-12's. It is however quite possible that Ukraine might one day mount an MT-12 on the MT-LB chassis.

Second Nagorno-Karabakh War 
During the Second Nagorno-Karabakh War (2020), the T-12 was used on the Armenian side.

Transnistria conflict 
During the 1992 Battle for Tighina/Bender, part of the Transnistria conflict, the Moldovan military utilized MT-12s to engage T-64BV tanks of the Pridnestrovian Moldavian Republic (PMR).

Other conflicts 
Incomplete, and stil requiring thorough check whether T-12 or MT-12 was used:
 Soviet–Afghan War
 Iran–Iraq War
 Persian Gulf War 
 War of Dagestan
 Russo-Georgian War
 Syrian civil war

Variants

Ukraine 

In August 2022, videos of a Ukrainian T-12 mounted on top of an MT-LB began to circulate online. While the combination was widely reported as mounting an MT-12, these same publications consistently showed photographs of a T-12 being mounted. The conversion was done by local infantrymen. A hydraulic stabilization or recoil-compensation mechanism is visibly mounted to the rear of the gun.

Romania
 A407 - This artillery system was designed by Arsenal-Resita and is very similar to the MT-12. It can fire the same range of ammunition as the T-54/55 tank and has a maximum range of 2,200 m (HEAT) or 4,000 m (APC-T). Subversions are the A407M1 and the A407M2. In Romanian Army service, the A407 is known as the 100 mm anti-tank gun M1977 and is normally towed by the DAC 887R truck. It can also be towed with the DAC 665T truck. The Model 2002 is an improved version, fitted with the automatic fire control system TAT-100.

People's Republic of China
 Type 73 - This appears to be a copy of the Soviet T-12.
 Type 86 - This is a 100mm smoothbore anti-tank gun that has some similarities with the 85mm Type 56 (D-44). It fires ammunition of the fixed type, including the Type 73 HE, Type 73 HEAT, Type 73 APFSDS and Type 86 APFSDS to a maximum range of 1,800 m.

See also 
 List of anti-tank guns
 List of military equipment of Croatia
 List of artillery of the Soviet Union and Russia

References

Citations

Bibliography
 
 
 
 
 
 
 
 USA Today article - https://www.usatoday.com/news/world/iraq/2003-03-25-war-zone_x.htm
 100 mm Ammunition https://web.archive.org/web/20070927080509/http://www.milparade.com/catalog/pdf/698.pdf
 100 mm Ammunition https://web.archive.org/web/20070927080621/http://www.milparade.com/catalog/pdf/697.pdf
 100 mm Ammunition https://web.archive.org/web/20041223234049/http://www.milparade.com/catalog/pdf/696.pdf
 MT-12 https://web.archive.org/web/20041214105425/http://www.milparade.com/catalog/pdf/99.pdf
 Jane's Armour and Artillery 2005-2006
 http://rbase.new-factoria.ru/missile/wobb/bastion/bastion.shtml

External links 

 T-12 walkaround on DishModels.ru
 http://www.globalsecurity.org/military/world/russia/t-12.htm
 Profile  part of The Wirlwind War a publication of the United States Army Center of Military History
 https://web.archive.org/web/20041223150348/http://www.milparade.com/catalog/part5/tank_rounds.shtml
 http://www.arsenal.ro/Arsenal/

100 mm artillery
Anti-tank guns of the Soviet Union
Cold War artillery of the Soviet Union
Anti-tank guns of the Cold War
Military equipment introduced in the 1960s